Abhishek Yeligar (born 20 June 1994) is an Indian badminton player.

Achievements

BWF International Challenge/Series (2 titles) 
Men's singles

  BWF International Challenge tournament
  BWF International Series tournament
  BWF Future Series tournament

References

External links 
 

Living people
1994 births
Indian male badminton players